Aymen Mouelhi (born 14 September 1986) is a semi-professional footballer who plays as a centre-back for St Joseph's. Born in Spain and raised in Tunisia, Mouelhi represents the Gibraltar national team after becoming naturalised in 2018.

International career
Mouelhi made his international debut for Gibraltar on 16 November 2018, coming on as a substitute in the 83rd minute for Joseph Chipolina in the 2018–19 UEFA Nations League D match against Armenia, which finished as a 6–2 loss. After a particularly impressive performance against Norway which saw the minnows restrict the Scandinavians to only 3 goals in a respectable defeat, Mouelhi went viral after he quipped that he "expected more" of the highly rated Norwegian striker Erling Haaland, who he had been tasked with marking throughout the game.

Personal life
Mouelhi is a fan of FC Barcelona, being born in the Catalan capital. Outside of football, he works in the tourism industry in Gibraltar.

Career statistics

International

References

External links
 
 
 

1986 births
Living people
Footballers from Barcelona
Gibraltarian footballers
Gibraltar international footballers
Gibraltarian people of Tunisian descent
Spanish footballers
Spanish people of Tunisian descent
Spanish sportspeople of African descent
Spanish expatriate sportspeople in Gibraltar
Spanish expatriate footballers
Tunisian emigrants to Gibraltar
Association football central defenders
Europa F.C. players
Lions Gibraltar F.C. players
Gibraltar United F.C. players
Tunisian Ligue Professionnelle 1 players
Gibraltar Premier Division players
Gibraltar National League players
Spanish emigrants to Gibraltar
Tunisian expatriate footballers
Tunisian expatriate sportspeople in Gibraltar